F minor is a minor scale based on F, consisting of the pitches F, G, A, B, C, D, and E. Its key signature consists of four flats. Its relative major is A-flat major and its parallel major is F major. Its enharmonic equivalent, E-sharp minor, has eight sharps, including the double sharp F, which makes it impractical to use.

The F natural minor scale is

Changes needed for the melodic and harmonic versions of the scale are written in with accidentals as necessary. The F harmonic minor and melodic minor scales are

Music in F minor 
Famous pieces in the key of F minor include Beethoven's Appassionata Sonata, Chopin's Piano Concerto No. 2, Ballade No. 4, Haydn's Symphony No. 49, La Passione and Tchaikovsky’s Symphony No. 4.

Glenn Gould once said if he could be any key, he would be F minor, because "it's rather dour, halfway between complex and stable, between upright and lascivious, between gray and highly tinted... There is a certain obliqueness."

Hermann von Helmholtz once described F minor as harrowing and melancholy. Christian Schubart described this key as "Deep depression, funereal lament, groans of misery and longing for the grave".

Notable compositions

Antonio Vivaldi
"Winter" from The Four Seasons, RV 297
Johann Sebastian Bach
Harpsichord Concerto No. 5
"Ich ruf zu dir, Herr Jesu Christ", BWV 639
Joseph Haydn
Symphony No. 49 ("La Passione")
Variations in F minor
Wolfgang Amadeus Mozart
Aria "L'ho perduta, me meschina" from The Marriage of Figaro, act 4
Adagio and Allegro in F minor for a mechanical organ, K. 594
Ludwig van Beethoven
Egmont Op. 84: Overture in F Minor
Piano Sonata No. 1, Op. 2/1
Piano Sonata No. 23 (Appassionata), Op. 57
String Quartet No. 11 "Serioso", Op. 95
Felix Mendelssohn
String Quartet No. 6
Carl Maria von Weber
Clarinet Concerto No. 1
Frédéric Chopin
Ballade No. 4, Op. 52
Fantaisie in F minor, Op. 49
Étude Op. 10, No. 9
Étude Op. 25, No. 2 "Bees"
Prelude Op. 28, No. 18 "Suicide"
Piano Concerto No. 2, Op. 21
Nocturne in F minor, Op. 55 No. 1
Mazurka Op. 63 No. 2
Mazurka Op. 68 No. 4 (Posthumous)
 Charles-Valentin Alkan
 Prelude Op. 31, No. 2 (Assez lentement)
 Symphony for Solo Piano, 2nd movement: Marche funèbre
Franz Liszt
Funérailles
Transcendental Étude No. 10 "Appassionata"
Trois études de concert, No. 2 "La leggierezza"
Franz Schubert
Fantasia in F minor
Impromptu No. 1, Op. 142
Impromptu No. 4, Op. 142
Johannes Brahms
Piano Quintet Op. 34
Piano Sonata No. 3 Op. 5
Pyotr Ilyich Tchaikovsky
Symphony No. 4
The Tempest
Anton Bruckner
Mass No. 3
Alexander Borodin
String Quintet
Paul Dukas
L'apprenti sorcier
Ralph Vaughan Williams
English Folk Songs
Symphony No. 4
Tuba Concerto in F minor
Dmitri Shostakovich
Symphony No. 1
String Quartet No. 11 Op. 122

E-sharp minor 

E-sharp minor is a theoretical key based on the musical note E, consisting of the pitches E, F, G, A, B, C and D. Its key signature has six sharps and one double sharp, (or eight sharps). Its relative major is G-sharp major, which is usually replaced by A-flat major. Its parallel major, E-sharp major, is usually replaced by F major, as E-sharp major’s four double-sharps make it impractical to use.

The E-sharp natural minor scale is:

Changes needed for the melodic and harmonic versions of the scale are written in with accidentals as necessary. The E-sharp harmonic minor and melodic minor scales are:

Although E-sharp minor is usually notated as F minor, it could be used on a local level, such as bars 17 to 22 in Johann Sebastian Bach's The Well-Tempered Clavier, Book 1, Prelude and Fugue No. 3 in C-sharp major. (E-sharp minor is the mediant minor key of C-sharp major.)

See also
Key (music)
Major and minor
Chord (music)
Chord names and symbols (popular music)

Notes

External links
 

Musical keys
Minor scales